Pholidostachys is a genus of palms found in Central America and northwestern South America (northwestern Brazil, Colombia, Ecuador, Peru).
 Pholidostachys amazonensis A.J.Hend. - Peru
 Pholidostachys dactyloides H.E.Moore. - Panama, Colombia, Ecuador
 Pholidostachys kalbreyeri H.Wendl. ex Burret - Panama, Colombia
 Pholidostachys occidentalis A.J.Hend. - Ecuador
 Pholidostachys panamensis A.J.Hend. - Panama
 Pholidostachys pulchra H.Wendl. ex Burret - Costa Rica, Nicaragua, Panama, Colombia
 Pholidostachys sanluisensis A.J.Hend. - Colombia
 Pholidostachys synanthera (Mart.) H.E.Moore - Colombia, Ecuador, Peru, Amazonas State of Brazil

References

Geonomateae
Arecaceae genera
Neotropical realm flora